Namboodiri Vidyalayam is an aided upper primary school in Kottappuram, part of Thrissur, Kerala, India. It was established by Yogakshema Sabha and is one of the oldest schools in Kerala established by the members of Nambudiri Brahmin community.

History
During the early 20th century, the Nambudiri community had strictly defied their children, both girls and boys to join in public schools. Years back, Nambudiris have always been great scholars in Sanskrit and the Vedas. But, their level concerning of modern education was very low. To conquer this crisis, in 1908, Yogakshema Sabha, an organization of Namboodiris established a school at Vadakkiniyedath Mana, Edakkunni, Ollur only for Namboodiri boys.

After three years, the school was shifted to Bhakthapriya Temple near Vadakkechira, Thrissur. In 1919, the school had named as Namboodiri Vidyalayam.  In 1928, it obtained its own properties like land and buildings when the school was started at near Kottapuram railway gate, Thrissur. In 1931, the Nambudiri girls also gained admission here. In 1949, the school became a public schools. Chittoor Narayanan Namboodiripad, Kurur Unni Namboodiripad, Chittoor Kunhan Namboodiripad and K. M. Vasudevan Namboodiripad were the main patrons of the school.

Famous alumnae
 V. T. Bhattathiripad 
 K. P. G. Namboothiri 
 M. P. Parameswaran
 Sathish Kalathil

References

Gallery

External links

Official Website

Primary schools in Kerala
High schools and secondary schools in Kerala
Schools in Thrissur district
Educational institutions established in 1919
1919 establishments in India